Atympanophrys is a genus of frogs in the family Megophryidae. They range from central China south to northern Vietnam. They are commonly known as hidden-tympanum horned toads.

Taxonomy 
They were synonymized with Xenophrys in 2006, but revived as a distinct genus based on studies in 2017 and 2021.

Amphibian Species of the World recognizes 4 species:

 Atympanophrys gigantica  — giant piebald horned toad
 Atympanophrys nankiangensis  — Nankiang horned toad
 Atympanophrys shapingensis  — Shaping horned toad
 Atympanophrys wawuensis  — Wawu horned toad

References 

Atympanophrys
Megophryidae
Amphibians of Asia
Amphibian genera